Rai HD is a group of television channels owned by Italian state-owned broadcaster RAI broadcasting in high-definition.

Rai HD Channels 

Rai 1 HD
Rai 2 HD
Rai 3 HD
Rai 4 HD
Rai 5 HD
Rai Movie HD
Rai Premium HD
Rai Gulp HD
Rai Yoyo HD
Rai News 24 HD
Rai Storia HD
Rai Sport HD
Rai Scuola HD

Logo Rai HD Channels

Programming 
Until 2012, Rai HD's programming consisted of an upscaled simulcast of Rai 1, with the exception of native HD TV shows recorded at 1080i. Since 2013, RAI increased its amount of TV shows recorded in HD, mostly from sister networks Rai 5 and Rai Sport. Most of them consist of films, science-fiction series and important events. On 25 October 2013, high-definition feeds were launched for Rai 1, Rai 2 and Rai 3, respectively, with Rai HD coexisting as a separate channel airing content from other sister network (which was eventually replaced by Rai 5 HD in September 2016). On 14 September 2015, Rai Sport 1 HD was launched and, on 21 October 2015, it was announced a plan to launch all of those HD channels on free-to-view satellite provider Tivùsat. In early-2016, Rai Movie, Rai 4 and Rai Premium launched their own HD feeds.

References

External links 
 Official site of Rai Terrestrial Digital
 Official site of Rai Way

Defunct RAI television channels
Television networks in Italy